Rose Public School, also known as RPS is a private secondary school in the Mithilanchal region of the Indian state of Bihar. It was established by Dr. Rajiv Ranjan, and is presently being run by a trust set up by him. It is a co-educational day and boarding school with around 5,000 students spread across Darbhanga, Laheriasarai and Madhubani. Rose Public School is affiliated to the Central Board of Secondary Education, based in New Delhi.

History

The school was founded in 1992 by Dr Rajiv Ranjan. Its first Principal  was prof.Neelmani Mukherjee, a retired Head of the English Department, Lalit Narayan Mithila University. It opened at West Digghi and shifted to its present campus at G.M. Road in Darbhanga. After that the school established its second branch at GN Ganj, Laheriasarai which was run by Honourable Principal In-Charge, Kafeel Ahmad who was known for his polite nature and soft behaviour. It is the first CBSE-affiliated school of the region.

Campus

The school is a co-educational day and boarding school with 5,000 students. Accommodation is provided to more than 200 boarding students within the separate boys and girls hostels. It is the second largest school on the basis of student strength in the whole of Bihar.

The school's facilities include two libraries that house 15,000 books jointly. The school has laboratories for computing, physics, chemistry, biology and mathematics.

The sports ground has facilities for volleyball, cricket, football, basketball, lawn tennis, table tennis and badminton.

References

External links
  Darbhanga

Education in Darbhanga
Educational institutions established in 1991
Schools in Bihar
1991 establishments in Bihar